Joseph Theodore Dickman (October 6, 1857 – October 23, 1927) was a United States Army officer who saw service in five wars, rising to the rank of major general.

Early life
Dickman was born in Dayton, Ohio. He attended the University of Dayton and graduated in the class of 1871. In 1881 he graduated from the United States Military Academy at West Point and was commissioned in the 3rd Cavalry. Among his fellow classmates were several men who would attain the rank of general officer, such as John Frank Morrison, Francis Joseph Kernan, Enoch Crowder, Edwin St. John Greble, Charles H. Barth, Clarence Page Townsley, Charles Leonard Phillips, George True Bartlett,  Joseph Alfred Gaston, Henry Clay Hodges Jr. and John Biddle.

Military career

Apache Wars and Border Duty 1883–1898
Dickman graduated from the United States Army Cavalry School in 1883 and proceeded directly to the Indian territory, where he participated in the Apache War from 1885–1886, to include the Geronimo Campaign. He next participated in the Mexican border patrol operations during the Garza Revolution against Garza revolutionists and the bandits, Benavides and Gonzales.

Dickman's early experience sent him to Fort Riley, where he was an Instructor at the Cavalry and Light Artillery School from 1893–1894. He deployed to the Pullman Strike in Chicago 1894. Later that year, he was assigned to Fort Ethan Allen, Vermont.

Spanish–American War, 1898–1900
Dickman's deployment during the Spanish–American War was notable. He participated in the Battle of San Juan Hill-El Caney, Santiago de Cuba. He served on the staff of General Joseph Wheeler during the Philippine–American War from 1899–1902 and at the Battles on the Island of Panay from 1899–1900.

Boxer Rebellion, 1900
During the Boxer Rebellion, Dickman was chief of staff to General Adna R. Chaffee for the Peking Relief Expedition and fought in the battle at Pa-ta-Chao, Peking on September 26, 1900.

1902–1917
Dickman was on the Army General Staff from 1902–1905. He was an instructor at the Army War College from 1905–1912. Dickman was the US Army Inspector General from 1912–1915, taking over 2nd US Cavalry in 1915. He was given command of the 85th Infantry Division, Camp Custer, Michigan, in August 1917.

World War I, 1917–1918

Dickman was given command of the 3rd Infantry Division in November 1917, at the onset of the United States' entrance into World War I. He deployed the 3rd Division to France aboard the Leviathan at noon, on March 4, 1918. He was the 3rd Division commander at Chateau-Thierry in May 1918 and was made famous at the Second Battle of the Marne in July 1918. While allied forces on both flanks retreated, the 3rd Division stood fast in the face of enemy offensives, which led to their moniker, "The Rock of the Marne."

Dickman commanded IV Corps from August to September 1918, to include the Saint-Mihiel Offensive in September 1918. He then commanded I Corps from October to November 1918, to include the Meuse-Argonne Offensive.

The Third Army was established under the command of Dickman by General John J. Pershing in France to advance to the Rhein and hold the Coblenz bridgehead, then prepare to serve after the war as the Army of Occupation of the Rhineland. The Third Army would have become the Army of Occupation whether or not the enemy signed the peace agreement. American fighting units not sent home were consolidated under Third Army and prepared to attack if Germany did not accept the terms of peace. The United States itself was not to sign the agreement but remained technically at war with Germany for two more years.

For his services during the war he was awarded the Army Distinguished Service Medal, the citation for which reads:

Post war
Dickman returned from World War I to serve as president of the Tactics and Organization Board, which reported on lessons learned during the war from April–July 1919. Dickman served as commanding general of the VIII Corps Area from 1919–21. He retired on October 6, 1921. He was later recalled to preside over postwar-army downsizing board in 1922. His memoirs were published in 1927.

Dickman died in Washington, D.C., on October 23, 1927. He was buried in Arlington National Cemetery.

Dates of rank

Awards and decorations
American awards

Foreign awards

Historical footnotes

USS Joseph T. Dickman
They each carried 35 landing boats and 2 tank lighters, along with 51 officers and a crew of 634. These newly commissioned U.S. Navy vessels were operated by the US Coast Guard. The USS Joseph T. Dickman carried soldiers of the 4th Infantry to the beaches of Normandy during Operation Overlord on D-Day.

The Dickman Rifles
The famous National Society of Pershing Rifles had its origin in 1894, when future general John J. "Black Jack" Pershing, then a second lieutenant in charge of military instruction at the University of Nebraska, started a "Varsity Rifles" drill team. A year later the unit was recognized as a fraternity and took on the formal name of "Pershing Rifles."

Similarly, the Dickman Rifles was an honorary military society formed at the University of Dayton to honor Maj. Gen. Joseph T. Dickman, Class of 1871. In May 1931 the Dickman Rifles were invited to a Pershing Rifles drill competition. This exposure to the National Society of Pershing Rifles led to a petition from the members to join the National Society.

Published works
Dickman, Joseph Theodore. The Great Crusade. A Narrative of the World War. NY: Appleton, 1927. An account of his war experiences.
Lieutenant, 3rd Cavalry. "Balloons in War." Cavalry Journal. 10: June 1897, 103–12.
Major, inspector general. "Cavalry Organization." Cavalry Journal. 22: January 1912, 650–56.
Lieutenant, 3rd Cavalry. "Dickman Field Holder (R)" Cavalry Journal. 10: March 1897, 80–82.
Captain, 8th U.S. Cavalry. "Experiences in China." Cavalry Journal. 13: July 1902, 5–40.
Lieutenant, 3rd Cavalry. "Field Exercise at Fort Leavenworth." Cavalry Journal. 10: June 1897, 158–66.
Captain, 8th Cavalry. "General Service and Staff College, Fort Leavenworth." Cavalry Journal. 13: October 1902, 217–31.
Major General, USA (Ret). "Great Crusade (R)." Cavalry Journal. 36: April 1927, 328.
"Has the Buffalo a Sense of Humor?" Cavalry Journal. 35: April 1926, 216.
Major. "Marching Cavalry in Rolling Country." Cavalry Journal. 18: April 1908, 703–08.
Lieutenant, 3rd Cavalry. "Military Policy and Institutions." Cavalry Journal. 10: December 1897, 383–96.
First Lieutenant, 3rd Cavalry. "New Method of Loading the Revolver." Cavalry Journal. 7:  June 1894, 178–79.
"Outline Descriptions of the Horse." Cavalry Journal. 10: March 1897, 40–44.
"Patrol Duty." Cavalry Journal. 11: March 1898, 102–44.
Maj. Gen., CG Third Army, A.E.F. "Plea for the Saber." Cavalry Journal. 29: October 1920, 251–53.
"Word to the Cavalry (by Captain Ludwig Drees)." Cavalry Journal. 29: April 1920, 93–96.
Dickman, Joseph T. (intro.) History of the Third Division United States Army in the World War. Andernach-On-The-Rhine, 1919. 397 p.
Dickman, J.T. et al. The Santiago Campaign. Richmond, VA:  Williams, 1927. 442 p.
Dupuy, Trevor N., et al. The Harper Encyclopedia of Military Biography. NY:  Harper Collins Publishers, Inc., 1992. p. 219.
General Orders No. 17, War Department, 1927. Summarizes his career.
Pitt, Barrie. 1918: The Last Act. New York, 1963.

Translations
General Von der Goltz's "Conduct of War."

Bibliography

References
Association of Graduates, U.S.M.A. Register of Graduates and Former Cadets. Cullum no. 2905.
Third US Army Official Dickman Bio

Notes

|-

1857 births
1928 deaths
American military personnel of the Spanish–American War
American military personnel of the Philippine–American War
United States Army personnel of the Indian Wars
Honorary Knights Commander of the Order of the Bath
Recipients of the Distinguished Service Medal (US Army)
United States Army Cavalry Branch personnel
University of Dayton alumni
United States Army generals of World War I
United States Military Academy alumni
Military personnel from Ohio
United States Army generals
United States Army War College faculty